Nasser Ali Abdullah al-Dhaibani (1968 – 3 December 2021) was a Yemeni army major general who served as head of the Military Operations Authority of Yemeni Army. In 2021 he was killed during battles with the Houthis.

Early life and education 
General Nasser was born in Al Radma District, Ibb Governorate. He received his basic education in Kuwait, then returned to complete his secondary education in the city of Al Nadera in Ibb Governorate. In 1986 he joined the armed forces and entered  the Military College in Sana'a. He also obtained a bachelor's degree from Sana'a University. Then he got a master’s degree from the Command and Staff College in the Republic of Sudan.

Career 
After graduating from the Military College, he served in the Military Police as company commander, then Deputy Commander for Technical Affairs Department, then in the Office of the Supreme Commander of the Armed Forces, and later in the Military Intelligence.

 Chief of Staff of the 31st Armored Brigade in Aden
 Commander of the 130th Brigade
 Commander of the Serwah Front
 Commander of the 133rd Brigade
 Director of the Department of Military Operations
 Commander of the Seventh Military Region
 Deputy head of the Military Operations Authority
 Commander of the 3rd Military Region
 Head of the Military Operations Authority

References 

1968 births
2021 deaths
Yemeni generals
20th-century Yemeni military personnel
Yemeni military officers
Yemeni military personnel killed in the Yemeni Civil War (2014–present)
People from Ibb Governorate
Yemeni Military Academy alumni
21st-century Yemeni military personnel